Annemarie Biechl (born February 6, 1949, in Gundelsberg, Bad Feilnbach) is a German politician, representative of the Christian Social Union of Bavaria. She is representative of the Landtag of Bavaria.

See also
 List of Bavarian Christian Social Union politicians

References

Christian Social Union in Bavaria politicians
1949 births
Living people